Brandon Pirri (born April 10, 1991) is a Canadian professional ice hockey centre who is currently an unrestricted free agent. He most recently played for the Rockford IceHogs of the American Hockey League (AHL). He was selected by the Chicago Blackhawks in the second round (59th overall) of the 2009 NHL Entry Draft. Pirri has also played for the Florida Panthers, Anaheim Ducks, and Vegas Golden Knights.

Playing career
Pirri committed to a collegiate career with RPI Engineers in the ECAC. He was invited to take part in Canada's 2011 national junior team selection camp, but was not included on the final roster.

Pirri was recalled by the Chicago Blackhawks after the 2012–13 NHL lockout ended. During the 2013–14 season, on March 2, 2014, Pirri was traded by the Blackhawks to the Florida Panthers for a 2014 third round pick and a 2016 fifth round pick.

In the 2015–16 season, Pirri scored 11 goals in 52 games before he was traded by the Panthers to the Anaheim Ducks in exchange for a 6th round pick on February 29, 2016.

As a free agent in the offseason from the Ducks, Pirri belatedly signed a one-year $1.1 million contract with the New York Rangers on August 25, 2016.

On July 17, 2017, Pirri was reportedly signed to a one-year contract by the ZSC Lions of the National League (NL). However, with an announcement never materialising he remained a free agent, later accepting an invitation to return to his former club, the Florida Panthers, on a professional try-out contract on August 29, 2017. After competing in training camp and pre-season, Pirri was unable to earn a contract with the Panthers and was released on October 1, 2017. Three days later he agreed to a one-year deal for the 2017–18 season with the Vegas Golden Knights. On April 3, 2018, Pirri was called up to the NHL. Pirri scored two goals on three shots in a shootout victory over the Vancouver Canucks, earning his 100th career NHL point.

On September 28, 2020, the Blackhawks reacquired Pirri from the Golden Knights in exchange for Dylan Sikura.

Career statistics

Regular season and playoffs

International

Awards and honors

References

External links

1991 births
Anaheim Ducks players
Canadian ice hockey centres
Chicago Blackhawks draft picks
Chicago Blackhawks players
Chicago Wolves players
Florida Panthers players
Living people
New York Rangers players
Rockford IceHogs (AHL) players
RPI Engineers men's ice hockey players
Ice hockey people from Toronto
Vegas Golden Knights players